A graveyard slot (or death slot) is a time period in which a television audience is very small compared to other times of the day, and therefore broadcast programming is considered far less important. Graveyard slots usually displayed in the early morning hours of each day, when most people are asleep.

With little likelihood of a substantial viewing audience during this daypart, providing useful television programming during this time is usually considered unimportant; some broadcast stations go off the air during these hours, and some audience measurement systems do not collect measurements for these periods. Some broadcasters may do engineering work at this time. Others use broadcast automation to pass-through network feeds unattended, with only broadcasting authority-mandated personnel and emergency anchors/reporters present at the local station overnight.  A few stations use "we're always on" or a variant to promote their 24-hour operation as a selling point, though as this is now the rule rather than the exception it was in the past, it has now mainly become a selling point for a station's website instead.

Programming

The most well-known graveyard slot in most parts of the world is the overnight television slot, after late night television and before breakfast television/morning show (between 2:00 and 6:00a.m.). During this time slot, most people are asleep, leaving only insomniacs, intentionally nocturnal people, and irregular shift workers as regular potential audiences. Because of the small number of people in those categories, the overnight shift was historically ignored as a revenue opportunity, although increases in irregular shifts have made overnight programming more viable than it had been in the past. In the United States, for example, research has shown that the number of televisions in use at 4:30a.m. doubled from 1995 to 2010 (8% to 16%).

Since the advent of home video recording, some programs in this slot may be transmitted mainly with time-shifting in mind; in the past, the BBC offered specialized overnight strands such as BBC Select (an often-encrypted block providing airtime for specialized professional programmes), and the BBC Learning Zone (which broadcast academic programmes, such as from the Open University). The BBC's current "Sign Zone" strand broadcasts repeat programmes with in-vision interpretation in British Sign Language. Some channels may carry adult-oriented content in the graveyard slot, depending on local regulations. Live events from other time zones (most often sports) may sometimes fall in overnight slots, such as daytime events from the Asia-Pacific region on channels in the Americas, and prime-time events from the Americas on channels in Europe for example. Some anime-oriented streaming services (such as Crunchyroll) have arrangements with Japanese networks to premiere episodes at the same time as their domestic television airings, often falling within the overnight hours in the Americas.

Since the 1980s, graveyard slots, once populated by broadcasts of syndicated reruns and old movies, have increasingly been used for program-length infomercials or simulcasting of home shopping channels, which provide a media outlet with revenue and a source of programming without any programming expenses or the possible malfunctions which might come with going off-the-air. In addition, the graveyard slots can also be used as dumping grounds for government-mandated public affairs programming, as well as in-house programming a station group is mandated by their parent company to carry that would otherwise be unpalatable in prime timeslots. One example of the latter mandated by Sinclair Broadcast Group in the United States is The Right Side, a public affairs program hosted by political commentator Armstrong Williams (who has business interests with Sinclair) that is typically aired by Sinclair-affiliated stations, and is intended to air in weekend late morning slots as a complement to the national networks' Sunday morning talk shows. However, The Right Side is often programmed in graveyard slots on most Sinclair stations who locally choose to instead fill the weekend morning slots with educational shows, paid programming (including religious programs and real estate presentation shows), weekend morning newscasts and local public affairs programming, or have no scheduling room due to network sports telecasts.

Graveyard slots are also used by U.S. television stations as a de facto "death slot" for syndicated programs that either failed to find an audience or which a station acquired but otherwise has no room to air in a more appropriate time slot where the program would otherwise benefit. In previous years, the most often seen original programming in the overnight period were low-rated daytime talk shows and game shows being burned off. In many cases where a television station carries an irregularly-scheduled special event, breaking news or severe weather coverage that preempts a network or syndicated program, the station may elect to air the preempted programming in a graveyard slot during the same broadcast day to fulfill their contractual obligations. In markets with sports teams whose coaches' and team highlights shows preempt programs in the prime access hour before primetime, the overnight period also allows a preempted program to air in some form on a station without penalty to the syndicator, or for stations to air network programming preempted for local-interest programming, breaking news or weather, or sporting events.

In a number of larger and middle markets in the United States, MyNetworkTV, which started as a general network in 2006 meant for primetime clearance, but due to the failure of its original programming schedule, eventually became a programming service carrying nightly rerun blocks of syndicated programming from broadcast networks and cable channels, has seen its timeslot downgraded to the graveyard slot. Generally, this is done as the stations of MyNetworkTV have become part of duopolies with major network affiliate stations (and even those owned by its parent company, Fox Television Stations) and those stations have used the MyNetworkTV affiliates to carry extended primetime local newscasts and local sports which provide steadier ratings and revenue than MyNetworkTV's non-original schedule.

The overnight period is also noted for the prevalence of cheaply produced local advertisements which allow an advertiser to purchase time on the station for a low cost, advertisements for services of a sexual nature (such as premium-rate adult rate entertainment services, adult entertainment venues, and adult products from companies such as Adam & Eve), direct response advertising for products and services (often marketed "As Seen On TV") otherwise seen during infomercials, and public service announcements (such as those commissioned by the Ad Council) airing in these time slots due to the reduced importance of advertising revenue.

Network overnight programming 
The Big Three television networks in the United States all offer regular programming in the overnight slot. Both ABC and CBS carry overnight newscasts with some repackaged content from the day's previous network news broadcasts, with an emphasis on sports scores from West Coast games that typically conclude after 1a.m. ET and international financial markets with the ending of the Australasian and beginning of the European trading day, all of which takes place between 2 and 5a.m. ET, while NBC (which dropped its overnight news in the late 1990s) replays the fourth hour of Today. Each network also produces its early morning newscast at 4a.m. ET so that it may be tape-delayed to air as a lead-in to local news. A growing trend in the United States is an increasingly early local newscast, which now begins as early as 4:00a.m. in some major markets, targeting those who work early shifts or are returning from late shifts; this early newscast would fit into the overnight daypart rather than breakfast television.

The graveyard slots' lack of importance sometimes benefits programs; producers and program-makers can afford to take more risks, as there is less advertising revenue at stake. For example, an unusual or niche program may find a chance for an audience in a graveyard slot (a current day example is Adult Swim's FishCenter Live, which features games projected onto the video image of an aquarium), or a formerly popular program that no longer merits an important time slot may be allowed to run in a graveyard slot instead of being removed from the schedule completely. However, abusing this practice may lead to channel drift if the demoted programs were presented as channel stars at some time.

Up until 2014, some cable networks would broadcast educational programing that educators can tape as part of Cable in the Classroom during these hours.

Examples

Japan
Japanese over-the-air stations broadcast late night anime almost exclusively, starting in the Late night television slot at 11:00p.m., but bridging the graveyard slot and running until 4:00a.m.. Because advertising revenue is scant in these time slots, the broadcasts primarily promote DVD versions of their series, which may be longer, uncensored, and/or have added features like commentary tracks, side stories and epilogues.

United Kingdom
In the UK, overnight is defined as 12:30 to 6:00a.m. and full-time overnight broadcasting began on ITV in 1987 and 1988 with the BBC and Channel 4 beginning overnight broadcasts in the late 1990s.
 
From 2000 to 2013 during this time BBC One repeated recent programmes with in-vision signing in a slot called  Sign Zone before simulcasting with BBC World News (in a 3-way simulcast between BBC One, BBC News Channel and BBC World News for the second part). Since then, the BBC News has generally begin between midnight and 1a.m., and before handing over the BBC News a weather for the week ahead bulletin is shown. BBC Two shows Sign Zone and repeats for the first part and the rest of the high is given over to  "This is BBC Two" which broadcasts excerpt from forthcoming BBC Two programmes. The BBC News Channel simulcasts with BBC World News during these hours. Notable examples of digital channels are BBC Three and BBC Four, which stay on the air until 4am and then close down, marked in schedules are This is BBC Three and This is BBC Four respectively.

ITV shows Ideal World and then repeats before showing Unwind with ITV/STV until 5:05 am on weekdays followed by Tipping Point, and 6a.m. at the weekend. Channel 4 shows repeats and films during these hours. Channel 5 shows Supercasino and some repeats. Most digital channels during this time either go off air or show simulcast with shopping channels and some stay on the air.

United States
Outside of the traditional overnight slots, various examples of graveyard slots in the United States exist. While the reasons vary, often these time periods are viewed with much lower interest from programmers as opposed to other periods of the day (particularly prime time from Monday to Thursday nights).

Weekdays, noon to 1 p.m. 
Before the 1970s, this slot was often viewed as a popular "lunch slot" where daytime shows such as Jeopardy! were popular with a larger-than-average audience that included both college and high school students and employees either returning home or eating at a restaurant on their lunch break, in addition to the traditional American daytime audience of stay-at-home housewives. However, as the 1970s dawned many network affiliates began introducing local midday newscasts which resulted in the time slot becoming a "death slot". Local news in this slot usually consists of stories from the morning newscast repeated with spare updating (including local political meetings), business and consumer news segments (including live stock market prices), farm reports in mainly rural markets, and community interest segments where organizations are highlighted in an interview setting, along with paid placement advertorial segments for businesses.

Stations that do not carry news in this slot usually air syndicated fare or an infomercial; in numerous cases, educational programs can be buried in this slot or any other daytime slot as a form of malicious compliance with the mandate for such programs. Mainly to accommodate affiliates in the Central and Mountain time zones that choose to air local news at noon in their respective markets, CBS and NBC still offer options for affiliates to air The Young and the Restless and Days of Our Lives at noon Eastern (11 a.m. Central), but actual participation in this varies by individual station.

After the 1970s ended, there were very few network programs that had survived for more than a year in the noon timeslot, including Ryan's Hope and Super Password. However, there have been numerous network programs that have aired in the second half hour of this timeslot; examples include The Young and the Restless (whose first half hour has dominated the timeslot since 1988), Sunset Beach, and Port Charles. The latter two were canceled after a few years on the air; since the mid-2000s, the 12:30 p.m. timeslot on most NBC and ABC affiliates has been usually filled with local news and lifestyle programs.

Weekdays, 4 to 5 p.m. 
When the noon time slot became unfavorable in the late 1970s, networks began doubling up airings of their noon shows at 4p.m.. However, this time slot had also quickly become unfavorable as many stations chose to preempt network offerings in favor of more lucrative syndicated programs during this time, including nationally syndicated talk shows hosted by Mike Douglas, Merv Griffin, Dinah Shore and Phil Donahue (all of which were primarily entertainment-focused with the exception of Donahue's which focused on serious subject matters including politics and cultural issues). As a result, the networks were faced with increasingly fewer affiliates airing network programs in this time slot and eventually abandoned this practice, with ABC canceling the soap opera Edge of Night at the end of 1984 and CBS ending production on Press Your Luck in the late summer of 1986, while the networks still continued to program occasional afterschool specials for children until 1996. During the 1980s, a slew of newer nationally syndicated talk shows made their debut, with the most prominent example being The Oprah Winfrey Show. Originally a locally based morning show in Chicago, Oprah made its debut as a nationally syndicated talk show in 1986 and soon came to dominate the time slot in many markets. Since the 1990s, the expansion of local television news has led to stations without major syndicated hits choosing to offer local news in this hour. By 2012, most networks' daytime programming had ended at 3p.m. Eastern, and many stations have begun offering up to three hours of local news, interrupted either by a 4:30 syndicated program or the 6:30 network news.

Friday night death slot 
Perhaps the most infamous example of a graveyard slot, ironically, has been during prime time on Friday nights since the 1990s. Before this decade, several television series during the late 1970s and 1980s (and well into the early 1990s) had become widely popular among the viewing audiences, and these programs including Dallas and Falcon Crest on CBS and Miami Vice on NBC became so popular that most programs that were scheduled against them were doomed to cancellation because of the competition, which marked the beginning of a phenomenon known as the "Friday night death slot." However, as the 1990s progressed, fewer viewers (particularly those in the much-sought after 18-49 demographic) stayed home to watch television on Friday nights, leading to a revival of the phrase in a new context in that a series on Friday was still more likely to lose money and lag in viewership compared to shows on other nights, regardless of its direct competition. More importantly, with media conglomerates now owning both television networks and film studios (e.g. Comcast's ownership of NBC and Universal Pictures under its NBCUniversal umbrella), the former now especially tends to downplay programming by corporate demand to attract moviegoers to theaters on the traditional opening night for major films.

Because of this trend, networks have since programmed inexpensive reality programming or news magazines on this night instead of scripted programs. Consequently, scripted programs that do end up airing on Friday night have often been moved there from more lucrative Monday-Thursday evening time slots due to poor performance, and this is often an indication that the series is facing cancellation, with its fate set in some cases either by extenuating circumstances or by certain goals for the producer or distributor in mind. The former was the case in the 2004-05 season with the ABC family sitcom 8 Simple Rules, whose ratings declined following the death of lead actor and protagonist John Ritter, while the latter pertained to the Fox sitcom 'Til Death, which was kept alive on Friday nights well into the 2009–10 season to garner enough episodes for an ultimately short-lived syndication deal.

Since 2005, CBS is the only major network that continues to air a full line-up of first-run scripted programming on Fridays, and has become successful on this night over the last 20 years with a number of successful (if older-skewing) serials and police procedurals featuring veteran actors, with former Miami Vice lead actor Don Johnson (in the titular role for Nash Bridges during the 1990s) and former Magnum, P.I. lead Tom Selleck (playing the lead character in Blue Bloods since 2010) among the more prominent examples. Its semi-sister network, The CW (co-owned with AT&T's WarnerMedia subsidiary) has also maintained an entire primetime schedule of younger-skewing scripted fantasy and action dramas since 2010, with similar success. Historically, ABC had notable success on Friday evenings with its TGIF lineup beginning in 1989, with its popular newsmagazine 20/20 serving as a lead-out, but the programming block's ratings began to wane in the late 1990s, in part also influenced by a botched attempt by CBS (called the CBS Block Party) to compete full-force with ABC during the 1997–98 season before it eventually abandoned this strategy in favor of the aforementioned primetime serials.

Despite being a known graveyard slot, there have been notable exceptions to this rule, with The Brady Bunch, Sanford and Son, Full House, Homicide: Life on the Street, Reba, Numb3rs, Ghost Whisperer, CSI: NY, WWE SmackDown, Last Man Standing, Shark Tank, Law & Order: Special Victims Unit and the aforementioned Blue Bloods among the more notable examples. In addition, a handful of cable channels have also had success with Friday night programming, with the most prominent being Disney Channel which since 2006 has aired a number of scripted sitcoms that appeal to a pre-teen audience including Wizards of Waverly Place, Phineas and Ferb, The Suite Life on Deck, Jessie and Girl Meets World, and has largely served as somewhat of a successor to sister network ABC's original TGIF lineup (albeit with a younger audience in comparison). Many cable networks, including Disney Channel as well as Hallmark Channel, also premiere original made-for-TV movies on this night several times per year as an attempt to keep potential movie-goers at home.

Saturday nights 
Until the 1990s, many popular series also aired on Saturdays, with more notable examples including Gunsmoke, Have Gun - Will Travel, All in the Family, The Mary Tyler Moore Show, The Bob Newhart Show and The Carol Burnett Show during the 1960s and 1970s on CBS, as well as The Facts of Life, and The Golden Girls and its numerous spin-offs on NBC during the 1980s and early 1990s; most networks maintained a full schedule (though the night was also often used for airing movies and select sporting events). During the 1990s, many successful programs aired during this decade as well including Dr. Quinn, Medicine Woman, Early Edition and Walker, Texas Ranger on CBS, The Pretender and Profiler on NBC, and Cops and America's Most Wanted on Fox.

Since then however, a similar situation to Friday nights emerged, with the same issue of fewer viewers available to watch television on Friday nights now extending to Saturday nights as well. For that reason, the mainstream U.S. networks have largely abandoned original programming on Saturday nights in favor of reruns, with only CBS maintaining a limited presence anchored by its newsmagazine 48 Hours. The last major efforts to program Saturday nights on the Big Three networks ended in 2001, when CBS canceled Walker, Texas Ranger and NBC failed with the original incarnation of the XFL. Fox continued to air Cops and America's Most Wanted on Saturday nights until both programs ended their Fox runs between 2011 and 2013 (with Cops moving to what is now Paramount Network and America's Most Wanted moving to Lifetime, where it remained until its cancellation in 2013). Between 2017 and 2019, CBS aired the Canadian/French co-production Ransom on Saturday nights during the middle of the television season.

In recent years, a new trend has emerged where a show that is considered to be a ratings failure (or is already canceled) is moved to Saturday nights to finish airing its original episodes, with the CBS miniseries Harper's Island in 200809, NBC's The Firm in 201112, and ABC's The Alec Baldwin Show and CBS's Million Dollar Mile in 2018–19 being some of the most notable examples. Otherwise, the night is used by the networks to air encore presentations of their weekday primetime series' most recent episode, or in ABC's case broadcasts of more recent theatrical movies, as well as to air sports programming including college football (e.g. SEC on CBS) on all of the major networks, NBA basketball on ABC, until 2021, NHL hockey on NBC, and, until 2019, UFC mixed martial arts fights on Fox. Local stations also use the night to carry specialized local news programs, including documentaries and political debates, where it would otherwise air their affiliate network's encore repeats.

Despite being a known graveyard time period, some channels have gained or maintained success on Saturday nights. Perhaps (and arguably) the most famous example has been NBC's late night program Saturday Night Live, which has been a staple of that network (and also that of the United States' pop culture conscience) since its 1975 debut, and has gone on to launch the careers of dozens of comedians and other actors. Other notable exceptions include Nickelodeon, which has successfully aired a Saturday primetime lineup of first-run programming aimed at pre-teens and teenagers since August 1992 (which has included popular series such as Clarissa Explains It All, All That, Kenan & Kel, iCarly, and Victorious), and Syfy, which has had respectable success with made-for-TV movies that regularly air during Saturday primetime.

To this day, many television stations in the United States have often filled their Saturday (and Sunday) late night slots with off-network syndicated reruns of primetime serials, long-form interview programs (including Entertainers with Byron Allen and In Depth with Graham Bensinger), movie showcases (including horror-themed Svengoolie and B-movie showcase Off Beat Cinema), and weekend editions of infotainment news programs (often with curated segments repackaged from earlier in the week or, in the case of Entertainment Tonight, special retrospect editions focused on a single topic). Sony Pictures Television, for instance, offers a selection of episodes from the previous season's runs of its popular weekday game shows Wheel of Fortune and Jeopardy! to air on weekends, usually airing in their traditional weekday slots. Historically, music and variety shows such as Hee Haw, The Lawrence Welk Show, Don Kirshner's Rock Concert, Solid Gold, Showtime at the Apollo and Soul Train, as well as weekly competition programs including American Gladiators and Star Search, also often filled weekend late night time slots (in many cases either complementing or even competing against Saturday Night Live). During the weekends, the prime access hour also featured popular weekly syndicated series including The Muppet Show during the 1970s and the movie review program At the Movies (known most famously under its original title of Siskel & Ebert) during the 1980s up to the 2000s.

Weekend mornings and afternoons 
Because people generally stay out later on Friday and Saturday nights than other nights of the week, people also tend to sleep in longer on weekend mornings. The weekend morning 57a.m. time slot is the most common time for stations to air public affairs and (on Sundays) televangelism programs. Nationally syndicated specialty news programs, including Matter of Fact (hosted by former NBC News and CNN anchor Soledad O'Brien and mandated to air on stations owned by its production company, Hearst Television) and Full Measure (hosted by former CBS News anchor Sharyl Attkisson and mandated to air on stations owned by its production company, Sinclair Broadcast Group), also air during weekend morning timeslots in many markets, often complementing their affiliate networks' and local stations' Saturday morning news programs and Sunday morning talk shows.

As has been the case since the beginning of television, the major networks have also generally programmed weekend afternoons with sporting events. That being the case, particularly when no sporting events are airing (either from the networks or from syndicated distributors such as Raycom Sports), there is very little incentive to watch television after Saturday morning news and educational programs or Sunday morning talk shows end, especially when a local team (particularly an NFL or college football team of either local or regional interest) is airing on one station, prompting other stations to outright refuse to put on competitive programming. Most stations in this situation air infomercials, movies, or little-watched syndicated fare in this slot, and often use this time period to air educational and public affairs programming mandated either by station groups or federal broadcast regulations, as well as regional lifestyle programs such as Texas Country Reporter which has been a weekend staple on most television stations serving the U.S. state of Texas since the 1970s. Prior to 2016, when it was not carrying content from sister network ESPN, ABC aired reality programming reruns in the late afternoon slot; one such program that aired in that slot was Million Dollar Mind Game.

Sunday nights (78p.m. and 1011p.m. during the NFL season) 
Because of overruns from National Football League (NFL) games, Sunday afternoon broadcasters Fox (in the earlier slot) and, to a lesser extent, CBS (in the latter slot) have had difficulty launching shows in these time slots. To handle overruns, Fox and CBS both use different strategies to handle prime time programming, with other networks attempting various means of counterprogramming to meet parity on the night:

 Fox, which primarily carries Sunday afternoon NFC road games, originally preempted its programming in the early time slot if an NFL game overran its time slot, often to the frustration of fans of series such as King of the Hill and Malcolm in the Middle, who often had episodes joined in progress or unseen in the Eastern or Central time zones until they were seen again during summer reruns after games ended. Fox has since addressed the issue by clearing out the time slot completely for an NFL post-game show titled The OT during the NFL regular season and setting aside a portion for short-run animated series under its Animation Domination (or, from 2014 to 2019, Sunday Funday) block, though mid-season replacement series have still had problems finding an audience in the time slot.
 CBS, which holds the rights to most Sunday afternoon AFC road games, protects its acclaimed newsmagazine 60 Minutes by delaying its entire prime time broadcast programming schedule if a game overruns, resulting in the show scheduled for the 10p.m. Eastern slot being pushed well past its original start time and occasionally being bumped to allow local CBS affiliates to air their local newscasts as close to 11p.m. Eastern as possible. After a series of new programs failed in that time slot, beginning in 2010 CBS attempted to stabilize it by moving an established series (usually one co-owned CBS Media Ventures already offers to stations in off-network syndication) there, starting with CSI: Miami which moved from its original Monday night slot to Sunday nights; CSI: Miami was nonetheless canceled after two seasons in its Sunday time slot. For the 2019–20 season, CBS used the 10p.m. slot to wrap up two of its veteran series with the final season of Madam Secretary airing in the fall followed by the final season of Criminal Minds (which once served as a lead-out to Super Bowl XLI in 2007) in the winter and spring, while for the 2020-21 season it aired what ultimately turned out to be the final season of NCIS: New Orleans.
 NBC holds the Sunday Night Football contract that takes up the entire night during the fall and early winter, and carries the pre-game show Football Night in America within the 7 p.m.-8 p.m. timeslot. Per NFL broadcast rules, the pre-game show utilizes a carousel reporting format to cover early games (approximately 1p.m. Eastern) before the conclusion of late (4p.m. Eastern) NFL games (including most games on the West Coast), and then transitions to a quick rundown before focusing on the upcoming game within the last twenty minutes before the game starts. After their NFL coverage ends in mid-January, NBC airs Dateline NBC in the 7p.m. slot for the rest of the season along with some limited first-run and encore programming. When the network carried the rights to Sunday afternoon AFC games from 1965 (when it acquired the television rights to the AFC's predecessor, the American Football League, from ABC) until losing those rights to CBS in 1998, the latter-day issues with regards to CBS were virtually nonexistent since most NBC programs in the 7p.m. Eastern slot usually trailed 60 Minutes on CBS; in the 1990s NBC attempted to compete full-force with 60 Minutes with a string of unsuccessful hard newsmagazines before relying on the lighter or true crime-focused Dateline. The most significant programming controversy during NBC's run as the AFC broadcaster came in 1968 during a high-profile West Coast game that prematurely ended broadcast in the Eastern and Central time zones to accommodate a made-for-TV adaptation of Heidi.
 ABC, which has not carried regular season NFL games since the move of Monday Night Football to sister network ESPN in 2006, has for most of its history since the 1990s carried America's Funniest Home Videos, a relatively low-cost and low-risk program popular for family viewing, in the early time slot. More recently, ABC has had somewhat greater success later in the evening with scripted dramas (e.g. The Practice and Brothers & Sisters). The NFL's preference in 2005 for a marquee Sunday night game as opposed to Mondays, which became difficult to envision due to the success of such aforementioned scripted dramas (at the time, Grey's Anatomy and Desperate Housewives) as well as the then-recently launched Dancing with the Stars, played a factor in Monday Night Football moving to ESPN in 2006. While some ABC affiliates occasionally simulcast Monday Night Football if a local team is playing (due to NFL rules requiring broadcast stations in team markets to simulcast national games not carried on network television), many others (including ABC's owned-and-operated stations) have deferred to rival stations in their market due to conflicts involving the live performance stages of Dancing with the Stars which air on Monday nights (in 2022, as part of a move to free up its schedule for occasional network simulcasts of Monday Night Football, ABC dropped Dancing with the Stars and moved it exclusively to Disney+, replacing it with the prerecorded Bachelor in Paradise on its fall lineup).
 The CW (and in the past The WB) has had varied scheduling strategies since the network's 1995 launch involving Sunday evenings. From 1995 until 2001, The WB aired new programming (usually sitcoms) in the 7 p.m. slot, and then from 2001 until 2007, aired encore programming (Seventh Heaven, Gilmore Girls and Reba) under the secondary titles Beginnings and Easy View. In the 2007–08 season, it featured advertorial entertainment programs (CW Now and Online Nation) that were widely considered a failure, with sitcom repeats taking over the slot mid-season. In 2008–09, the slot carried In Harm's Way, a reality series from the timeslot's lessee (Media Rights Capital) also considered a failure, and after that season, the CW returned Sunday evenings to their affiliates, leaving the night completely until returning in 2018–19. Unlike the other remaining networks, The CW chose to not program the 7 p.m. hour on Sunday evenings, maintaining the 8–10 p.m. window it programs throughout the rest of the week.
 UPN, which merged with The WB to form The CW in 2006, generally never programmed Sunday nights, with its only contribution to the night being in early 2001 lower-tier XFL football games on Sunday evenings during the league's only season in its first iteration. Its de jure successor MyNetworkTV has never programmed the night.

Opposite popular annual programming specials 
Programs such as the Academy Awards (on ABC since 1976), the Super Bowl and the Olympic Games (on NBC at least partially since 1988) have been known to draw so many viewers that almost all efforts to counterprogram against them have failed. As such, broadcasters have traditionally countered these events with either reruns or movies. In past years, seasonal airings of popular classic films such as Gone with the Wind, The Wizard of Oz and The Ten Commandments have also been known to draw sizable audiences. The Super Bowl has historically attracted more unusual fare (such as Animal Planet's Puppy Bowl, a football-themed special featuring puppies at play), with most aiming to counter the halftime show to emulate Fox's success with its live In Living Color special in 1992. However, as all four major commercial networks now have some tie to the National Football League's television deals (current through Super Bowl LVII in 2023, with all but ABC alternating to air the game), major networks have aired little to no new original programming on the night of the Super Bowl under an unsaid gentleman's agreement.

Opposite dominant television series 
On occasion, a regularly scheduled program may have this kind of dominant drawing power. Notable examples have included NBC's Thursday primetime schedule in the 1980s and 1990s that featured The Cosby Show, Seinfeld and ER, and American Idol during its original run's peak on Fox from the mid-2000s to the early 2010s (simultaneous with the peak of reality television in the U.S. during that period) - each of which was dubbed a "Death Star" by the other networks because of their prolonged dominance in the ratings, consistently ranking among the most watched broadcasts in U.S. television history. Many programs that competed against such shows often either flopped or (in the case of an existing series) saw their ratings decline significantly to the brink of cancellation.

Australia and New Zealand
In Australia and New Zealand, overnight is from midnight until 6:00am, and this slot generally consists of US sitcoms and dramas which ended up failing in their home market but need to air in some form to justify the network's investment, or archived content, along with teleshopping programmes, lower-tier US syndicated newsmagazines, and US breakfast television programmes delayed to fill the remainder of the slot.

Content requirements

In Canada, federal regulations require television channels and radio stations to carry a certain percentage of Canadian content. It is common for most privately owned television channels to air the bulk of their mandatory Canadian content in such graveyard slots (especially weekday mornings and Saturday nights), ensuring they can meet their required percentages of Canadian programming while leaving room for more popular foreign programming in other time periods. For over-the-air terrestrial television stations, the overnight hours are generally not subject to Canadian content requirements, allowing some opportunity for niche or experimental programming during those hours, although most commonly infomercials air instead. Canadian radio stations have similar practices regarding broadcasts of Canadian music, known pejoratively as the "beaver hour". For the most part in modern times however, Canadian content requirements are filled easily by television stations throughout the week through local newscasts and magazine programming, along with licensed versions of American programs such as ET Canada.

Likewise, in the United States, some stations attempt to bury mandated E/I educational television programming in graveyard slots, though under current regulations by the Federal Communications Commission (FCC), children's television series must air during times when children are awake (current standards as of 2019 state between 6:00a.m. and 10:00p.m.). Thus, these channels will "bury" E/I programs in the middle of a block of infomercials during daytime television hours, when most children are either at school or (on weekends) asleep or participating in youth sports, scouting or other activities, and are unlikely to ever see them, though a loophole allowing more advertising for shows targeted to teenage audiences means that most 2010s E/I programming has been generic documentary, game show, dramatic, or profile programming unlikely to be of interest to most children. Recent changes to E/I standards by the FCC on July 10, 2019 will also result in individual stations being given the option to carry up to 52 hours of E/I content that consists of either specials or short-form content, as well as digital subchannels no longer being required to carry E/I programming and individual stations being allowed to shift up to 13 hours of E/I programming per quarter (52 hours annually) over to a digital subchannel, which will likely result in further attrition of the already low audience shares for E/I programming in the United States.

See also
 Dayparting
 Prime time – the opposite of graveyard slots

References

External links

Audience measurement
Radio broadcasting
Television terminology
Television programming